Gong Zhu (拱猪) is a Chinese four-player trick-taking card game, and is a Chinese version of the game Hearts. It differs from the standard Hearts game by assigning special point values to cards. The objective of the game is to score positive points and avoid penalty points. Gong Zhu means: Chase the Pig, for "pig" is the name given to the Q♠.

All players start with 0 points. The goal is to not be the first person to go past -1000 points (thus losing the game) and in some variations, also not more than 1000 points. The loser(s) becomes the pig, as Gong Zhu means "chase the pig" in Chinese. All points accumulate until any player(s) have lost, for which the game ends and all points will be reset to 0.

Unlike in Western Hearts, there is no passing of cards prior to each round in Gong Zhu.

Point values 
 Point cards:
 The J (goat) is worth +100 points
 The Q♠ (pig) is worth -100 points
 The 10♣ (transformer) counts as zero points, but doubles a player's points at the end of a round and adds it to the accumulated points. If at the end of a round, a player has the 10 of clubs and no other point cards, the 10 of clubs is worth +50 points (or +100 if exposed: see below).
 The Hearts are worth -200 points  in total:
 Ace -50 points
 King -40 points
 Queen -30 points
 Jack -20 points
 10 through 5 are worth -10 points
 4 through 2 are worth no points 
 All other cards are worth 0 points and do not play a part in scoring.

Exposure of cards 

In Gong Zhu, a player may expose ("sell") the cards Q♠, J, 10♣, or A (affecting all hearts) before each round, thus showing the card(s) to the other players. By the rules of Gong Zhu, if a player exposes a card, he/she must not play it in the first trick when the dealer plays the corresponding suit, so as to be able to give a chance for players with higher cards to get rid of them without being disadvantaged by the exposure. The exception to this is when the exposed card is the only card in that suit (in any particular player's possession during that round).

For example, by exposing the Q♠, a player cannot play it in the first trick when the dealer plays a spade to allow players with the cards K♠ and A♠ to get rid of them.

Exposing a card doubles its effect. For example, if the Q♠ is doubled, it will be worth -200 instead of -100. In the case of the 10♣, since it isn't worth anything in itself, the doubling effect of the 10 of clubs is doubled, which if exposed and taken by that same player, will quadruple the value of all the other point cards collected in that round.

 If the Q♠, 10♣ and A have been exposed and a player has these three cards after one trick, then he/she will receive -1200 (4*((-100*2)+(-50*2))) points.
 If the A has been exposed and a player has all hearts but the ace, he/she will receive -300 (2*(-150)) points.

Playing 

In each trick, similar to Hearts, the suit is determined by the dealer who produces the first card. Players take turns to play a card in an counterclockwise direction and whoever produces the card of the largest value in the same suit collects all four cards and becomes the next dealer. In many variants, the holder of 2♣ starts the first trick, and any card can be played during the first trick other than exposed ones.

At the end of a round, all players' points are totaled up and added to their accumulated points for that game. Player(s) who have accumulated -1000 or lower points immediately lose that game (called "chulan"(出栏), meaning "being driven out of the pigsty (and ready for slaughter)"). After which, a new game begins and all points are reset to 0.

Scoring 
Legend
 - Point addition (Non-exposed cards)
 - Point addition (Exposed cards)
 - Point deduction (Non-exposed cards)
 - Point deduction (Exposed cards)
 - Not involved cards

Like Hearts, points calculated are on an accumulative basis; usually, players will be given the points that are assigned to whatever point cards he collected after one round. 
There are multiple ways to shoot the moon. Gong Zhu differs from hearts in that a player gains points by shooting the moon, instead of making other players lose points. In some cases, the J and the Q♠ switch values, giving negative points to unsuspecting players.

Terms & Jargon 

 Cards
 Pig's sty: meaning K♠ and A♠ for their ability to capture the pig.
 Sheep's sty: meaning Q, K, and A for their ability to capture the goat.
 Results
 Small slam: collecting all cards of hearts (A-2). In this case, all hearts become positive in point calculations.
 Grand slam: collecting all point cards. In this case, all hearts and Q♠ become positive in point calculations.
 Playing (many in this category was derived from bridge)
 Lead: to be the first player in a new trick. The lead of the first trick is the dealer.
 Last: to be the first player in a trick. Players usually try to be in this position to discard unwanted cards such as K♠, A♠, and large cards of hearts and played suits to avoid gaining negative points.
 Shot down(击落): to deplete a player of a suit and capture the guarded honor (usually J) or small hearts (when trying to shoot the moon).
 Self get(自得) or self eat(自吃): to capture a trick using J or Q♠ and capture itself
 Discard(垫): to play a card different from the color of the trick. This card is captured by the largest card of the correct trick. (This can only happen if a player have no cards of the correct trick)
 Declare(摊牌): similar to its counterpart in bridge, it means to expose the remaining hand and explain the plan and result for playing. Other players may agree or disagree to this statement.
 All-get(全大): Declaring that the player will continue to capture all remaining tricks and therefore all point cards remaining.

See also

Hearts
Polignac

References

External links 
 

Chinese card games
Four-player card games
Trick-avoidance games
Year of introduction missing